Alfred Jackson  (25 October 1887 – 21 September 1964) was an Australian military officer and an Australian rules footballer who played for the Essendon Football Club in the Victorian Football League (VFL).

Family
The son of Alfred Jackson (1858-1901), and Sarah Ann Jackson (1860-1952), née Williams, later Mrs Fisenden, Alfred Jackson was born in Brunswick, Victoria on 25 October 1887.

Football

Training Units team (AIF)
He played for the (losing) Australian Training Units team in the famous "Pioneer Exhibition Game" of Australian Rules football, held in London, in October 1916. A news film was taken at the match.

Military service
Jackson joined the Army in 1911 and applied for a commission at the commencement of World War I. He served at Gallipoli, being concussed and shot in action, but returned to the Peninsula after treatment in Malta and took over command of the 7th Battalion. 

He was subsequently transferred to France, promoted to lieutenant colonel and assumed command of the 60th Battalion, being involved in the Battle of Fromelles in June 1916. In July 1917 he assumed command of the 58th Battalion and later commanded various training units until the end of the war.

He was Mentioned in Despatches in 1918 and appointed as an Officer of the Order of the British Empire in 1919.

In World War II, Jackson served as a Lieutenant Colonel in the 3rd Ambulance Brigade.

See also
 1916 Pioneer Exhibition Game

Notes

References
 Photographs at Group portrait of officers of the 7th Battalion on the Aegean island of Lemnos (C01190), collection of the Australian War Memorial, and Volunteers of Essendon and Flemington, 1914-1918, Captain A. Jackson, empirecall.pbworks.com.
 Maplestone, M., Flying Higher: History of the Essendon Football Club 1872–1996, Essendon Football Club, (Melbourne), 1996. 
 First World War Embarkation Roll: Captain Alfred Jackson, collection of the Australian War Memorial.
 Honours and Awards (Order of the British Empire): Lieutenant Colonel Alfred Jackson, Australian War Memorial.
 Service "Timeline": Lieutenant Colonel Alfred Jackson, Australian War Memorial.
 First World War Nominal Roll: Lt. Col. Alfred Jackson (O.B.E.), collection of the Australian War Memorial.
 First World War Service Record: Lieutenant Colonel Alfred Jackson )BE), National Archives of Australia.

External links 
 		
 Fred Jackson at australianfootball.com

1887 births
1964 deaths
Australian rules footballers from Melbourne
Essendon Football Club players
Participants in "Pioneer Exhibition Game" (London, 28 October 1916)
Australian Officers of the Order of the British Empire
People from Brunswick, Victoria
Military personnel from Melbourne
Australian military personnel of World War I
Australian military personnel of World War II